Malton is a market town, civil parish and electoral ward in North Yorkshire, England. Historically part of the North Riding of Yorkshire, the town is the location of the offices of Ryedale District Council and has a population of around 13,000 people, measured for both the civil parish and the electoral ward at the 2011 Census as 4,888.

The town is located to the north of the River Derwent which forms the historic boundary between the North and East Ridings of Yorkshire.

Facing Malton on the other side of the Derwent is Norton. The Karro Food Group (formerly known as Malton Bacon Factory),  Malton bus station and Malton railway station are located in Norton-on-Derwent.

Malton is the local area's commercial and retail centre. In the town centre there are small traditional independent shops and high street names. The market place has recently become a meeting area with a number of coffee bars and cafés opening all day to complement the public houses.

Malton has been described as "the food capital of Yorkshire", and was voted one of the best places to live in Britain by The Sunday Times in both the 2017 and 2018 lists.

Malton was named the dog-friendliest town in the UK at the annual Dog Friendly Awards, in association with the Kennel Club in 2018/19. In 2020 Malton was named as one of the most dog-friendly staycation spots in the UK and the best in Yorkshire.

History

Roman

The earliest established building at Malton comes from the late first century AD when a Roman auxiliary fort was established, probably c.71 CE under the governor Petilius Cerialis around the same time as Eboracum, although it has been suggested that both sites may be slightly earlier. The site was established on the north bank of the River Derwent. A large civilian settlement developed opposite the fort, on the south of the river at Norton . A single Roman cavalry unit, the Ala Gallorum Picentiana is recorded from the site.Derventio 

The site remained occupied (and subject to continued development) throughout the four centuries of Roman occupation in Britain, particularly in the Trajanic, Severan, Constantian and Theodosian periods and is notable for the manufacture of jet jewellery at the site as well as a single unique inscription identifying a goldsmith shop.

Medieval
There was some form of settlement in New Malton by 1138 and old Malton was probably also founded in the 1100s; a Gilbertine monastery was built between 1147 and 1154 in Old Malton, while the monastic church was probably built around 1180. The first reference to a market in New Malton was in a 1283 document, indicating that craftsmen and others, such as butchers, were selling their wares.

Earlier, in the 11th century, a wooden Norman castle, Malton Castle, was built in what is now Castle Garden. This was rebuilt in stone by Eustace de Vescy (1169-1216) by the time Richard the Lionheart visited the castle in 1189. Other visitors included Edward II, in 1307 and Robert the Bruce in 1322. The great house subsequently became ruined.

The castle site was inherited by Lord William Eure (c. 1483–1548) in 1544, when he was also made a baron. In 1569 Ralph Eure built a new house on the castle site and in 1602, the house was rebuilt in much grander style. This was a spectacular property and it was described by the diarist and gunpowder plotter Sir Henry Slingsby as the rival of many other great houses, including that at Audley End.

The house was subsequently demolished in 1674 and the stones divided between two sisters, Mary (who married into the Palmes family) and Margaret Eure. (The site is now Castle Garden.) They had quarrelled over their inheritance and the demolition was the settlement ordered by Sheriff Henry Marwood. The Old Lodge Hotel is the remaining fragment of the original Jacobean "prodigy house" and its size hints at the grandeur of the complete structure.

18th, 19th and early 20th centuries

According to contemporary archives, during the 18th century attention was paid to improving the facilities for traders in Malton, in particular for the numerous butchers, .

The town's Shambles, currently opposite Malton Town Hall, used to be located on the north side of St Michael's Church, which still stands in the centre of the Market Place. The Talbot Hotel, still standing and renovated, dates back to the early 17th century and may contain remnants of the medieval town wall. It was initially used as a hunting lodge and became an inn in 1740; it was also a coach stop. The property, with its associated buildings in Talbot Yard, is now Grade II listed. In the Victorian era, it was known as Kimberley's Hotel.

The town hall was commissioned in 1749. The building was first used as a butter market, butter being the main marketable product for many farmers of the day. The town hall was extended and changed at various intervals over the years.

A sure sign of a town 'up and coming' was the advertisement of a 'light coach, setting out from Leeds to Scarborough returning to Malton to dine.'

In the last year of the 18th century, there was a famine in the area, and a soup kitchen was set up in a brew house in the town. The Earl Fitzwilliam of the time subscribed to a fund, which helped provide 'good strong soup' for the hungry poor.

In 1801 the population of Old and New Malton numbered 3,788. The workhouse contained 15 elderly people and 17 children.

In 1809 Malton's Talbot Hotel was extended and modernised with a third floor being added and new stables being constructed across the road from the hotel.

The town's Assembly Rooms were opened in 1814, a place in which 'polite society' could mingle. An 1833 Gazeteer stated that New Malton did a great deal of trade in coal, corn, butter, etc. There were two churches, four meeting houses for "dissenters", a free school and a national school. A bridge connected this town to Old Malton. Several schools or academies were operating by the 1820s, on a fee basis.

According to the 1840 edition of White’s Gazetteer, Malton's "town and suburbs have much improved during the last twenty years, by the erection of houses; and gas works were constructed in 1832." The streets of Malton were lit with gas for the first time on 12 November 1832; the first electric light was lit in 1893, powered by a dynamo, in a single location. By 1867, the Malton Waterworks was supplying residents with water.

By 1835, medical care was being provided at The Dispensary on Saville Street; this was a  predecessor of the Malton Cottage Hospital which would not open until August 1905, funded by donations and a subscription. As late as 1841, dental care was provided by barbers; a Mr. Moseley was a prominent "surgeon-dentist".

Newspapers were well established in 1855, when the tax on newspapers was repealed. The Malton Messenger and The Malton & Norton Gazette were both weekly publications.

In 1856, the town was policed by the North Riding, with four men and a superintendent. Thomas Wilson was the Chief Police Officer. The Malton Town Gaol had been opened decades earlier. Work on new police house started in October 1893. By 1881, the Malton Fire Brigade, was operating with a steam engine.

In 1881, the population of Old and New Malton totaled 8,750 persons. Newer industries in New Malton included iron and brass foundries.

The development of the local railway network flourished during the mid-1800s – the York to Scarborough railway opened in 1845 and the Malton and Driffield Junction Railway opened in 1853. The Malton railway station is now Grade II listed (since 1986).

During the early 1900s, electricity was installed in much of the town. Before the Second World War, several buildings were erected, including the Court House, Cottage Hospital and Police Station. The town was bombed during the war.

Navigation on the River Derwent
The navigation capacity on the Derwent was one of the earliest in Britain to be significantly improved around 1725, enabling extensive barge traffic to transport goods and produce.

The navigation continued to compete with the railway, having been extended as far as Yedingham after 1810. The river's use as a highway declined only after it was bought by the Railway itself and cheaper coal began to arrive by rail, while river maintenance was deliberately neglected.

Governance
In Medieval times, Malton was briefly a parliamentary borough in the 13th century, and again from 1640 to 1885; the borough was sometimes referred to as 'New Malton'. It was represented by two Members of Parliament until 1868, among them the political philosopher Edmund Burke, and by one member from 1868 to 1885.

Ryedale District Council is the local authority.

The current Member of Parliament for Thirsk and Malton (since 2015) is Kevin Hollinrake of the Conservative Party.

Today

The Fitzwilliam family has been important in the history of Malton for centuries, and its descendants, as the Fitzwilliam Malton Estate, own much of the commercial area in and around the town. In 1713 The Hon Thomas Watson Wentworth purchased the Manor of Malton, beginning a long association between the town and the Wentworth, Watson-Wentworth, Wentworth-Fitzwilliam, and Naylor-Leyland families. A book detailing the history since 1713 was published in 2013, written by Norman Maitland, entitled 300 years of continuity and change: families and business in Malton from the 18th century to the present.

Attractions in modern Malton include the signposted remains of the Roman fort at 'Orchard Fields', and Malton Priory a Gilbertine priory. Eden Camp, a military themed museum, is located just outside the town. Malton Museum is located at the Subscription Rooms in Yorkersgate. The town has an independent cinema, which also houses the World Wide Shopping Mall, and independent retailers, high street shops, cafés, public houses and restaurants. Malton's three microbreweries, Brass Castle and Bad Seed, host an annual spring 'BEERTOWN' festival at the town's Milton Rooms. The third microbrewery is Malton Brewery which is known for making Yorkshire Pudding Beer. The brewery is located in Navigation Wharf.

Both towns are known in connection with Charles Dickens, who made regular visits to the area to see his friend Charles Smithson. Dickens did not write A Christmas Carol while staying in Malton, but was inspired by some of the buildings in the town. There have been recent revivals of Dickens-related festivals. Malton and the neighbouring village of Old Malton provide the settings for the collection of stories told in the book, All is Bright - A Yorkshire Lad's Christmas by Dave Preston.

In September 2013 Ryedale District Council issued their Local Plan Strategy. The current Local Plan, produced in September 2013, supports Malton (together with Norton, its twin town on the south side of the river Derwent) as Ryedale District's Principal Town. The Local Plan sees Malton's historic town centre as the thriving and attractive cultural and economic heart of the area. During the Plan's period until 2027, Malton and Norton will be the focus for the majority of any new development and growth including new housing, employment and retail units. The Local Plan establishes a level of housebuilding of 200 units per annum for the whole district in order to deliver at least 3,000  (net) new homes over the period of 2012 to 2027. Approximately 50% of the planned supply – around 1,500 new homes - will be directed to Malton and Norton. A further plan for employment land is proposed for Malton. Of the 37 hectares of employment land required to meet the needs of the district until 2027, approximately 80% will be allocated towards Malton and Norton. For retail development the plan reflects Malton's role as the main retail centre serving Ryedale, and will direct most new retail and other town centre uses to Malton in order to support and promote its role as a shopping, employment, leisure and cultural centre for Ryedale.

Malton holds a market every Saturday, and a farmers' market once every month. The town has a war memorial and several historical churches (Norton-on-Derwent also holds large church buildings). The town is served by Malton railway station. The livestock market, currently situated on the edge of the town centre will be relocated to a site close to Eden Camp once construction work there is complete.

Malton is the middle-ground between York, Pickering (access to the North York Moors and also a terminus of the North Yorkshire Moors Railway), Scarborough, Filey and Whitby. The route of The White Rose Way, a long-distance walk from Leeds to Scarborough, North Yorkshire also passes through Malton.

Malton and Norton is significant for its horse racing connections, and has a number of training stables in the vicinity. The most recent Malton Stables Open Day, held in August 2013, showcased 19 trainer stables. Writer Norman Maitland describes the history of horse racing as "being in the blood in this part of Yorkshire for generations ..." with meetings being advertised as early as 1692. The Malton Races were run on Langton Wolds, between 1692 and 1861.

Malton is also used to flooding, with notable floods in 1999, 2000, 2007, 2012, 2015, 2016, 2017, 2018 and 2021.

Since the flooding in 2021, several flood schemes have been implemented by Ryedale and North Yorkshire County Councils to try to limit flooding on the Derwent.

We Love Malton
The 'We Love Malton' campaign was launched in March 2009. It aimed to reinvigorate the town of Malton as a 'Food Lovers' destination and raise its appeal with both residents and tourists. The 2015 festival included special guest chef Rosemary Shrager. The Festival for 2018 took place on 27 and 28 May. A harvest festival was also scheduled for 8 September. By 2017, the town was considered to be the food capital of Yorkshire. Food is the main attraction, but tourists can also find a small museum, a cinema, and a theatre. Malton is also well located for visiting the North York Moors and the seaside towns of Whitby, Scarborough and Bridlington.

Malton Community Interest Company (Malton CIC)
Formed in 2011, Malton CIC benefits the area with donations to local organisations, including Ryedale Book Festival. The CIC also finances and provides two hours free parking in Malton's Market Place. It helps organise and fund Malton Food Lovers Festival and the Malton Monthly Food Markets.

Skatepark 

Malton skatepark is situated on Norton Road and is made up of wooden ramps on a tarmac base. The skatepark features a back and forth run with a quarter pipe and flat bank either side of a pyramidal funbox, as well as a mini ramp, grind rail and grind box. It also has a Halfpipe (Vert Ramp) which has now become world famous. It is now one of only nine in the country and is the only free to use outdoor vert ramp in the north of England. Ryan Swain has been spearheading a global campaign called #rescuetheramp appealing to the towns councils to restore it. Swain also got world famous skateboarder Tony Hawk to support his campaign.

Religion
Malton's churches include St Michael's Anglican church and Ss Leonard & Mary Catholic church. There are other churches in the area.

Education
There are two secondary schools in Malton and Norton, Malton School, founded in 1547, and Norton College. Primary education is provided by St Mary's RC Primary School, Norton Community Primary School and Malton Community Primary School. The nearest independent school is Terrington Hall Prep School.

Climate
As with the rest of the British Isles and Yorkshire, Malton possesses a maritime climate with cool summers and mild winters. Due to its lower elevation, the town centre is likely to be marginally warmer than High Mowthorpe throughout the year.

Transport

Malton is bypassed by the A64, which runs from Leeds and York to Scarborough, with a junction at the A169 to Pickering and Whitby.

Malton railway station is on the TransPennine Express route, with fast trains every hour running from Scarborough to York, Leeds, Manchester and Liverpool. Current fastest train time from Malton to London Kings Cross (with one change at York) is approximately 2 hours 33 minutes, while Malton to Leeds can take as little as 51 minutes.

Malton's bus service is run by Coastliner, a division of the TransDev bus group. Buses run from Leeds and York through Malton to Pickering/Whitby, Scarborough, and Bridlington. There are also regular buses to Castle Howard and Hovingham, and a number of local bus routes.

Notable people from Malton
 Alan Brown – racing driver
 Edmund Carter – cricketer
 Adrian Dalby – cricketer
 Brian Dutton – English professional football coach and former player
 Simon Dyson  – golfer
 Terry Dyson – professional football player
 Tim Easterby – racehorse trainer. Easterby's training stables Habton Grange are near Malton
 Edgar Firth – cricketer
 Scott Garnham – actor
 Charles Hall – New Zealand politician
 Francis Jackson – organist and composer
 Richard Leonard MSP – Leader of the Scottish Labour Party
 James Martin  –  TV chef
 Leo Sheffield – singer and actor
 Jon Sleightholme – former England Rugby Union international
 Ryan Swain  –  TV & Radio Presenter & DJ
 Alfred Tinsley – cricketer

See also
 Derventio (Malton)
 Mike Pannett

Notes

References

 Derventio - (Malton) Roman Fort and Civilian Settlement L. Peter Wenham (Cameo Books 1974)
 The Romans In East Yorkshire John H. Rumsby, English Life Publications 1980
 Mosaic – the Pavement that Walked Clive Ashman (Voreda Books, London,)
 300 years of continuity and change: families and business in Malton from the 18th century to the present. Norman Maitland, published by Malton CIC in 2013.

External links

 
 Malton on Ryedale.co.uk
 Malton Mercury Newspaper
 Malton Museum
 We Love Malton

 
Market towns in North Yorkshire
Civil parishes in North Yorkshire
Towns in North Yorkshire
Ryedale